Christopher William Bellamy, Baron Bellamy,  (born 25 April 1946) is a British barrister and former judge.

Early and personal life 
Born on 25 April 1946, Bellamy's father was a physician. Bellamy attended the independent Tonbridge School and then Brasenose College, Oxford.

He is a member of the Athenaeum and Garrick clubs.

Career 
Bellamy was called to the bar at the Middle Temple in 1968. He spent a year teaching before starting to practise as a barrister in 1970, when he joined Monckton Chambers. He developed specialisms in European, competition and regulatory law, and in 1986 was appointed Queen's Counsel.

Between 1992 and 1999, Bellamy was a judge of the Court of First Instance of the European Communities. He then served as a judge on the Employment Appeal Tribunal between 2000 and 2007, and as president of the United Kingdom's Competition Appeal Tribunals for the Competition Commission (between 1999 and 2003) and then of the Competition Appeal Tribunal (from 2003 to 2007).

After leaving the judiciary in 2007, Bellamy became a senior consultant at Linklaters, where he was appointed chairman of its Global Competition Practice in 2011. He left Linklaters in 2020 and resumed practising as a barrister at Monckton Chambers.

Bellamy was elevated to the peerage as Baron Bellamy, by Prime Minister Boris Johnson.

On 7 June 2022, Bellamy was appointed Parliamentary Under-Secretary of State for Justice in the Ministry of Justice, replacing David Wolfson. Aged 76, he became the oldest minister in the Government. He was reappointed by Liz Truss and by Rishi Sunak.

Honours 
Bellamy was a bencher of the Middle Temple in 1994. He was knighted in the 2000 New Year Honours. On 14 June 2022, to facilitate his ministerial role, he was created Baron Bellamy, of Waddesdon in the County of Buckinghamshire, for life, and was introduced to the House of Lords the same day, supported by Baroness Scott of Bybrook and Lord Anderson of Ipswich.

References 

1946 births
Living people
British barristers
20th-century English judges
English King's Counsel
Alumni of Brasenose College, Oxford
Knights Bachelor
Life peers created by Elizabeth II
Conservative Party (UK) life peers
21st-century English judges
People educated at Tonbridge School